Šumperák (officially Rodinný dům typ V) is a nickname for a type of single-family detached house in the Czech Republic and Slovakia. Its design was created in the 1960s, referring success of the Czechoslovak pavilion at Expo 58 designed in so–called "Brussels style". 

The house was designed by a Czech architect Josef Vaněk, firstly for the director of the hospital in a Czech town Šumperk. Later, the design has spread around the country and thousands (more than 4.5 thousands) of them were built, often modified. The design of this two floor house is famous for the balcony, which has two oblique walls on the sides.

References

House types
Modernist architecture in the Czech Republic
1960s architecture